Ugolino of Forlì or Ugolino of Orvieto was an Italian music theorist and composer of early Renaissance music.

Life and career
Ugolino was born in Forlì, but was named Urbevetano (of Orvieto) because his father, Francesco, was from Orvieto. He died at Ferrara.

Works 
Declaratio musicae disciplinae (five books), written during the beginning of his time in Ferrara.

References

1380 births
1450s deaths
Italian male composers
Italian music theorists
Trecento composers
15th-century Italian composers